Philip Mestdagh (born 26 January 1963) is a Belgian basketball coach of the Belgian women's national team, which he coached at the EuroBasket Women 2017 and the 2018 FIBA Women's Basketball World Cup.

References

1963 births
Living people
Belgian basketball coaches
Olympic coaches